Warren Mattice Anderson (October 16, 1915 – June 1, 2007) was an American lawyer and politician from New York. He was Temporary President and Majority Leader of the New York State Senate from 1973 to 1988.

Life
He was born on October 16, 1915, in Bainbridge, Chenango County, New York, the son of Floyd E. Anderson (1891–1976), later a State Senator and Supreme Court Justice, and Edna Madeline (Mattice) Anderson (born 1889).

Anderson graduated from Colgate University in 1937, and from Albany Law School where he was an associate editor of the Albany Law Review.  He served in the United States Army during World War II, attaining the rank of Second Lieutenant in the Judge Advocate General's Corps.

Following the war he served as Assistant County Attorney for Broome County, and then joined the Binghamton law firm of Hinman, Howard & Kattell.

A Republican, Anderson was a member of the New York State Senate from 1953 to 1989, sitting in the 169th, 170th, 171st, 172nd, 173rd, 174th, 175th, 176th, 177th, 178th, 179th, 180th, 181st, 182nd, 183rd, 184th, 185th, 186th and 187th New York State Legislatures. He was Chairman of the Committee on Finance from 1966 to 1972. In this capacity he was the unofficial deputy to Temporary President Earl Brydges. After Brydges retired, Anderson succeeded him as Temporary President and Majority Leader. Anderson worked with Governor Hugh Carey and Assembly Speaker Stanley Steingut to put together a package to rescue New York City from bankruptcy in 1975.

Anderson served in the Senate's top post until 1989, when he re-joined the law firm of Hinman, Howard & Kattell, LLP in Binghamton, New York. In May 2006, Anderson announced his endorsement of former Assembly Minority Leader John Faso for the Republican nomination for governor.

In his role as Temporary President of the Senate, Anderson twice performed the duties of the Lieutenant Governor of New York. The first was from December 18, 1973 to December 31, 1974 after the resignation of Gov. Nelson Rockefeller elevated Lt. Gov. Malcolm Wilson to the governorship. The second was from February 1, 1985, to December 31, 1986 after Lt. Gov. Alfred DelBello resigned.

In 1978, Anderson was a candidate for the Republican nomination for Governor of New York, but lost the nomination to Perry Duryea.

He died on June 1, 2007.

Interstate 88, which runs from the Southern Tier to the Capital District, was named in his honor.

References

External links
 Warren M. Anderson Papers, Binghamton University Libraries

1915 births
2007 deaths
Lieutenant Governors of New York (state)
Republican Party New York (state) state senators
Politicians from Binghamton, New York
Majority leaders of the New York State Senate
People from Bainbridge, New York
20th-century American politicians
Lawyers from Binghamton, New York
20th-century American lawyers
United States Army personnel of World War II
United States Army officers
United States Army Judge Advocate General's Corps